, officially called , is a skyscraper located in the Meieki district of Nakamura-ku, Nagoya, Aichi, Japan. It opened in early 2007. It is the tallest building in Nagoya and the fifth tallest building in Japan as of 2015. At 247m (810 feet), it is slightly taller than the nearby JR Central Towers.

Midland Square houses offices of many companies including Toyota Motor Corporation, Towa Real Estate and Mainichi Shimbun. It features a shopping center with 60 name-brand stores, two automobile showrooms and a cinema. It also holds the record for the highest open-air observation deck in Japan. Also of note are the unusual double-floored elevators, which take only 40 seconds to rise to the top.

The name of the building derives from the Chūbu region (which means "central region") of which Nagoya is the capital.

Gallery

References

External links 

  Midland Square, official site

Skyscrapers in Nagoya
Buildings and structures completed in 2007
Tourist attractions in Nagoya
Skyscraper office buildings in Japan
Retail buildings in Japan